Richie Ephraim Musaba (born 6 December 2000) is a Dutch professional footballer who plays as a midfielder for TOP Oss on loan from Fortuna Sittard.

Career
On 12 May 2019, Musaba made his professional debut with Vitesse in a 6–1 Eredivisie win against De Graafschap, coming on as a substitute for Navarone Foor in the 82nd minute and scoring his team's last goal minutes later.

After failing to break through at Vitesse, he joined Fortuna Sittard on 4 September 2020 on a two-year contract, who sent him on a one-season loan to second-tier side FC Dordrecht on the same day. He made his debut for Dordrecht on 7 September in a 2–1 loss to FC Den Bosch, coming on as a substitute in the 88th minute for Kevin Jansen. 

On 29 July 2022, Musaba was loaned to TOP Oss.

Personal life
Musaba was born to Congolese parents. His twin brother Anthony is also a professional footballer.

References

Living people
2000 births
People from Beuningen
Dutch footballers
Dutch people of Democratic Republic of the Congo descent
Association football forwards
Eredivisie players
SBV Vitesse players
Fortuna Sittard players
FC Dordrecht players
TOP Oss players
Dutch twins
Twin sportspeople
Footballers from Gelderland